The South Africa national cricket team toured Australia in the 1963–64 season and played 5 Test matches against Australia. The series was drawn 1–1. After the series, the South Africans toured New Zealand, playing a three-Test series.

South African team

 Trevor Goddard (captain)
 Peter van der Merwe (vice-captain)
 Eddie Barlow
 Colin Bland
 Peter Carlstein
 Buster Farrer
 Clive Halse
 Denis Lindsay
 Joe Partridge
 David Pithey
 Tony Pithey
 Graeme Pollock
 Peter Pollock
 Kelly Seymour
 John Waite 

Of the 15 players, only Goddard (20 Tests), and Waite (41) had played more than six Tests. Seven players (van der Merwe, Halse, Lindsay, Partridge, David Pithey, Graeme Pollock and Seymour) had not yet played a Test; all made their Test debuts on the tour.

The manager was Ken Viljoen.

Test series summary

First Test
{{Two-innings cricket match
| date = 6–11 December 1963(5–day match)
| team1 = 
| team2 = 

| score-team1-inns1 = 435 (114.6 overs)
| runs-team1-inns1 = BC Booth 169
| wickets-team1-inns1 = PM Pollock 6/95 (22.6 overs)

| score-team2-inns1 = 346 (135.5 overs)
| runs-team2-inns1 = EJ Barlow 114
| wickets-team2-inns1 = R Benaud 5/68 (33 overs)

| score-team1-inns2 = 144/1d (35 overs)
| runs-team1-inns2 = WM Lawry 87*
| wickets-team1-inns2 = JT Partridge 1/50 (17 overs)

| score-team2-inns2 = 13/1 (6.3 overs)
| runs-team2-inns2 = TL Goddard 8*
| wickets-team2-inns2 = GD McKenzie 1/3 (3.3 overs)

| result = Match drawn
| report = Scorecard
| venue = Brisbane Cricket Ground, Woolloongabba, Brisbane
| umpires = CJ Egar and LP Rowan
| toss = Australia won the toss and elected to bat.
| rain = 8 December was taken as a rest day.There was no play on the third day.| notes = TR Veivers and AN Connolly (both AUS), and RG Pollock, DT Lindsay, PL van der Merwe, DB Pithey, MA Seymour and JT Partridge (all SA) made their Test debuts.
}}

Second Test

Third Test

Fourth Test

Fifth Test

References

Annual reviews
 Playfair Cricket Annual 1964
 Wisden Cricketers' Almanack 1965, pp. 818–38

Further reading
 R.S. Whitington, Bradman, Benaud and Goddard's Cinderellas, Rigby, 1964
 Bill Frindall, The Wisden Book of Test Cricket 1877-1978, Wisden, 1979
 Chris Harte, A History of Australian Cricket, Andre Deutsch, 1993
 Ray Robinson, On Top Down Under, Cassell & Co., 1975
 Graham Short, The Trevor Goddard Story, Purfleet, 1965, pp. 100–159
 various writers, A Century of South Africa in Test & International Cricket 1889-1989'', Ball, 1989

External links
 South Africa in Australia and New Zealand 1963-64 at CricketArchive

1963 in Australian cricket
1963 in South African cricket
1964 in Australian cricket
1964 in South African cricket
Australian cricket seasons from 1945–46 to 1969–70
International cricket competitions from 1960–61 to 1970
1963-64